Gubrawoolly or Gubrawully (Irish derived place name either Gob a Raith Bhuailidh, meaning the 'Headland of the Dairy Fort' or Gob an Mhullaigh, meaning the ‘Headland of the Summit’) is a townland in the civil parish of Kinawley, barony of Tullyhaw, County Cavan, Ireland.

Geography
Gubrawoolly is bounded on the west by Altbrean, Altinure, Drumcask and Sralahan (Kinawley) townlands and on the east by Derryrealt, Drumbeagh, Drumcar (Kinawley) and Drumcullion townlands. Its chief geographical features are small hills which rise to 525 feet above sea level, the River Cladagh (Swanlinbar), a mountain trout stream which later joins the River Cladagh (Swanlinbar), small rivulets, forestry plantations and dug wells. Gubrawully is traversed by the regional R200 road (Ireland), the local L1024 road, minor public roads and rural lanes. The townland covers 304 statute acres.

History

In earlier times the townland was probably uninhabited as it consists mainly of bog and poor clay soils. It was not seized by the English during the Plantation of Ulster in 1610 or in the Cromwellian Settlement of the 1660s so some dispossessed Irish families moved there and began to clear and farm the land.

The 1825 Tithe Applotment Books spell the name as Guberawella.

An 1831 map spells the name as Gubberawooly and Gubberawooley and lists the owner as the Hassard estate.

Griffith's Valuation lists twenty-five landholders in the townland.

Gubrawully folklore is found in the 1938 Dúchas collection.

Census

In the 1901 census of Ireland, there are seventeen families listed in the townland.

In the 1911 census of Ireland, there are fourteen families listed in the townland.

Antiquities

 A lime-kiln
Stone bridges over the river
 A ford over the river
 Stepping-stones over the river

References

External links
The IreAtlas Townland Data Base

Townlands of County Cavan